The 1958 National League was the 24th season and the thirteenth post-war season of the highest tier of motorcycle speedway in Great Britain.

Summary
Bradford Tudors who had dropped out at the start of the previous season only to return in mid-season, had dropped out again along with the bottom side Rayleigh Rockets. Poole Pirates returned after a one-year absence. Wimbledon Dons won their fourth title in five years.

Final table

Top Ten Riders (League only)

National Trophy
The 1958 National Trophy was the 20th edition of the Knockout Cup. Belle Vue were the winners.

First round

Second round

Semifinals

Final

First leg

Second leg

Belle Vue were National Trophy Champions, winning on aggregate 136–103.

See also
 List of United Kingdom Speedway League Champions
 Knockout Cup (speedway)

References

Speedway National League
Speedway National League
Speedway National League